François Marquet (born 17 April 1995) is a Belgian footballer who plays as a midfielder for Romanian Liga I club FC U Craiova 1948.

Career
He signed his first professional contract for Standard Liège in April 2013. On 19 May 2013, he made his debut in the Belgian Pro League against Lokeren. He started the game and played the first half. He's a youth exponent from the club. On 3 January 2015, it was announced that PSV Eindhoven had loaned Marquet, with the possibility to sign him permanently included. However, PSV decided against this option, with the result Marquet returned to Standard Liège at the end of the season.

On 18 August 2021, he signed with FC U Craiova in Romania.

References

External links

1995 births
People from Theux
Living people
Belgian footballers
Association football midfielders
Belgium youth international footballers
Standard Liège players
Jong PSV players
Royal Excel Mouscron players
S.K. Beveren players
K.V. Oostende players
FC U Craiova 1948 players
Belgian Pro League players
Eerste Divisie players
Liga I players
Belgian expatriate footballers
Expatriate footballers in the Netherlands
Belgian expatriate sportspeople in the Netherlands
Expatriate footballers in Romania
Belgian expatriate sportspeople in Romania
Footballers from Liège Province